Lakhisarai (archaic spelling: Luckeesarai) town is the administrative headquarters of Lakhisarai district in the Indian state of Bihar. The town has a population of 99,931 (2011 census). it is situated about 45 km west of Munger.

Demographics
As of 2011 Indian Census, Lakhisarai had a total population of 99,979, of which 52,665 were males and 47,314 were females. Population within the age group of 0 to 6 years was 17,641. The total number of literates in Lakhisarai was 57,902, which constituted 57.9% of the population with male literacy of 63.9% and female literacy of 51.2%. The effective literacy rate of the population above 7 years of age in Lakhisarai was 70.3%, of which male literacy rate was 77.6% and female literacy rate was 62,2%. The Scheduled Castes and Scheduled Tribes population was 10,730 and 180 respectively. Lakhisaraihad 17214 households in 2011.

References 

Cities and towns in Lakhisarai district
Lakhisarai district